Paul Michael Lyons McStay, nicknamed The Maestro, (born 22 October 1964) is a Scottish former professional footballer who spent his entire career with Celtic, making his senior debut in 1982 and retiring in 1997. He captained both Scotland and Celtic at all age levels. He was capped 76 times for his country and scored nine goals. He helped Celtic win three league titles, the last in 1988.

Club career
As a youth, McStay first came to prominence in June 1980 in a schoolboy international match when Scotland played England at Wembley. Then 15, he was the captain. He scored two goals and was awarded the Man of the Match award after Scotland ran out 5–4 winners.

McStay signed for Celtic aged sixteen from Celtic Boys Club in 1981. He made his first team debut on 23 January 1982 in a 4–0 win over Queen of the South in the Scottish Cup. A week later on 30 January, he made his first league appearance in 3–1 win over Aberdeen at Pittodrie. He scored the third goal, taking a pass from George McCluskey, running through the Aberdeen defence and striking a left foot shot past Jim Leighton in goal.

Season 1982–83 saw the young midfielder establish himself as a first team regular, and he picked up his first winners medal on 4 November 1982 in Celtic's 2–1 win over Rangers in the League Cup Final. His performances resulted in media speculation that Inter Milan were considering making a £2 million bid to take him to Italy, a rumour that was emphatically dismissed by the Celtic chairman, Desmond White.

McStay continued to progress at Celtic, and he scored Celtic's equaliser in the 1984 Scottish Cup Final against Aberdeen to take the match into extra time. However, Celtic had played most of the match with 10 men after Roy Aitken was sent off in the first half, and Aberdeen scored in extra time to win 2–1.

In December 1987, during Celtic's centenary season, McStay signed a five-year contract at Celtic. He went on to enjoy his finest season, winning both the SPFA and Scottish Football Writers player of the year awards as the club won a League and Cup double in 1988.

When Roy Aitken left Celtic Park in 1990, McStay was appointed club captain, a position he retained until his retirement following the 1996–97 season. In his time with the club, Celtic won the League title three times, the Scottish Cup four times and the League Cup once. Although the second half of McStay's career coincided with a time when Celtic performed poorly and struggled financially, in 2002 he was voted a member of Celtic's greatest ever team by the club's fans. He is also a member of the Scotland Football Hall of Fame, which honours the best players to play in Scotland and is located in the Scottish Football Museum.

International career
In 1982 he captained Scotland to victory in the UEFA European Under-18 Championship, the only major trophy won by any Scottish national football team. He captained each of the Scotland teams from under-16 level through under-18, under-20, under-21 and senior level. McStay made his full national team debut in 1983. He represented Scotland 76 times, including appearances at two World Cups in 1986 and 1990, during a 14-year international career. McStay was also selected for two UEFA European Championships in 1992 and 1996, but withdrew from the latter because of an ankle injury.

Personal life
In 2010, McStay moved to live in Sydney, Australia with his wife Anne Marie and their six children. He now runs Maestro Sports, a startup software company specialising in sport coaching and management. McStay attempted to raise $100,000 AUD to fund an autobiography through the crowdfunding platform Kickstarter.

McStay's great-uncles Jimmy and Willie McStay were former Celtic captains, and his brothers Willie and Raymond also played for Celtic. Their father John worked as a scout for the club.

One of his sons, Chris, has played football for Sutherland Sharks and Rockdale Ilinden in Australia and for Clyde in Scotland. His nephew John (Willie's son) played with Celtic Boys Club before moving onto Motherwell under-19s and later played for Ayr United as a defender before becoming a Celtic academy coach.

His cousin Jock McStay played for Raith Rovers during the 1990s, and Jock's son Jonny played at Junior level in the 2010s.

Career statistics

Club

International

Scores and results list Scotland's goal tally first, score column indicates score after each McStay goal.

Honours
Celtic
Scottish Premier Division: 1981–82, 1985–86, 1987–88; runner-up: 1982–83, 1983–84, 1984–85, 1986–87, 1995–96, 1996–97
Scottish Cup: 1984–85, 1987–88, 1988–89, 1994–95; runner-up 1983–84, 1989–90
Scottish League Cup: 1982–83; runner-up 1983–84, 1986–87 1990–91, 1994–95
Glasgow Cup: 1981–82

Scotland
Rous Cup: 1985; runner-up: 1986, 1989

Scotland U18
UEFA Youth Championship: 1982

Scotland U16
Victory Shield: 1980
Dentyne Trophy: 1980

Individual
SFWA Footballer of the Year: 1987–88
SPFA Players' Player of the Year: 1987–88
SPFA Young Player of the Year: 1982–83
Scotland national football team roll of honour : 1990
Scottish Football Hall of Fame: 2010
Ballon d'Or: 1984 (18th place)

See also
 List of footballers in Scotland by number of league appearances (500+)
List of Scotland national football team captains

References

External links

International stats at Londonhearts.com
The Bhoy in the Picture – Paul McStay
England schoolboys v Scotland schoolboys (1980) 4–5

1964 births
Living people
1986 FIFA World Cup players
1990 FIFA World Cup players
Celtic F.C. players
Association football midfielders
Members of the Order of the British Empire
Scotland international footballers
Scottish footballers
Scottish Football League players
UEFA Euro 1992 players
Scottish Football Hall of Fame inductees
People educated at Holy Cross High School, Hamilton
Footballers from Hamilton, South Lanarkshire
Scotland under-21 international footballers
Scotland youth international footballers
Paul